Chan Chan is an archaeological site in the Peruvian region of La Libertad and was the capital city of the late intermediate period of the Chimor kingdom (850-1470 AD).

Chan Chan may also refer to:

 Chan-Chan, an archaeological site of an Early Neolithic hunter-gatherer camp (3700-3000 BC) on the coast of the commune of Mehuín in southern Chile
 Chan Chan (forest), a former forest that existed near Osorno and La Unión in Southern Chile, was cleared with fire in 1851
 Chan Chan (singer), a Myanmar / Burmese pop singer and model
 "Chan Chan" (song), a song by Cuban bandleader Compay Segundo
 Chan Chan, a song on the soundtrack to the 2005 film Water